World Series of Fighting 4: Spong vs. DeAnda was a mixed martial arts event held  in Ontario, California, United States.

Background

Tyrone Spong and Angel DeAnda were scheduled to fight at WSOF 3, However, on May 1, it was announced that Spong had been pulled from the card due to visa issues. On June 7, 2013, it was announced the bout would take place at this event.

On June 12, 2013, WSOF president Ray Sefo announced he would return to fighting at this event.

Former UFC vet Jared Papazian stepped in for the injured Joe Murphy.

Lew Polley was scheduled to face Hans Stringer in a Light Heavyweight bout on the undercard.  Polley, however, showed up 32 pounds over the weight limit at the weigh ins and the bout was subsequently cancelled.

Results

See also 
 World Series of Fighting
 List of WSOF champions
 List of WSOF events

References

World Series of Fighting events
2013 in mixed martial arts